Anders Fredriksen (born 17 February 1981 in Fredrikstad) is a retired Norwegian professional ice hockey player, who played several seasons for Vålerenga in GET-ligaen.

Club career

Early career
He moved to Sweden as a 17-year-old, and started playing for Frölunda in the Swedish junior league, J20 Superelit. After having 42 points in 39 matches during the 1999–2000 season, he signed with Tingsryd in HockeyAllsvenskan.

Skellefteå
On 15 May 2001, it was announced that Fredriksen would leave Tingsryd for the ambitious Northern Swedish team Skellefteå, along with Daniel Ström and Pasi Mustonen.

Vålerenga
Before the 2003–04 GET-ligaen season, Fredriksen decided to move back to Norway and play for Vålerenga Ishockey. After having three straight 40+ points seasons, he had 58 points in 45 matches in the 2009–10 GET-ligaen season, and finished sixth in the point statistics. In his last season as an active player, he played for Lørenskog.

International career
Fredriksen played for the Norwegian national team during the 2000 and 2001 IIHF World Championship. After 9 years absence, he was again selected for the 2010 and 2011 Championships. He has also played on the Norwegian national junior team.

References

External links

1981 births
Living people
Norwegian ice hockey centres
Norwegian expatriate ice hockey people
Frölunda HC players
Lørenskog IK players
Skellefteå AIK players
Tingsryds AIF players
Vålerenga Ishockey players
Sportspeople from Fredrikstad